Adrian Roger Kirshaw Pierson (born 21 July 1963) is a former first-class cricketer. He was a right-handed batsman and a right-arm off-break bowler. He was born at Enfield, Middlesex.

In sixteen years at the top level of cricket, he played for Cambridgeshire, Derbyshire, Leicestershire, Somerset and Warwickshire. Pierson was a skilful all-rounder who was later to coach the Derbyshire Scorpions into the 2003 final of the Twenty20 Cup, where they lost by one run to Leicestershire.

He now coaches and plays for Houghton and Thurnby Cricket Club, whilst captaining the first team.

References

External links
 

1963 births
Living people
English cricketers
Derbyshire cricketers
Leicestershire cricketers
Somerset cricketers
Warwickshire cricketers
People from Enfield, London
Cambridgeshire cricketers
Test and County Cricket Board XI cricketers